Swanwick railway station is a railway station in Fareham, Hampshire, England. Despite its name, it is actually located in Park Gate, one mile south of Swanwick.

The station opened on 2 September 1889, and was specially built for the local strawberry industry.  For a short time each year, it was one of the busiest stations in the country.  The station is near a small industrial estate between the residential areas of Locks Heath and Whiteley.

History 
Swanwick was one of two intermediate stations originally provided, but unlike its neighbour , it was provided with a crossing loop so that two trains could pass each other on the single-track route.
The local area's strawberry industry  provided up to 7,000 tons each year in the late 1800s.  During the harvest, Swanwick Station became one of the busiest in the country with "Strawberry Specials" heading to Covent Garden and across the country.  Long platforms were constructed to accommodate the trains.

After the Second World War, the station was mainly used for passenger services.

Services 
Services at Swanwick are operated by Southern and South Western Railway. The off-peak service Monday to Friday’s in trains per hour is:

Southern
 1 tph to 
 1 tph to  via 

South Western Railway
 1 tph to 
 1 tph to

Facilities 

The station is by far the busiest between Fareham and Southampton and enjoys more facilities than most on the line. The ticket office is open between 5.45am and 7pm weekdays (shorter hours at the weekend). Toilet facilities and a waiting room are within the ticket office area (not available when the ticket office is closed).

The station is fully covered by CCTV, as is the large cycle shed and car park adjacent the station. There are customer help points and covered areas on both platforms.  Disabled customers cannot gain access to the Fareham-bound platform.

Outside the station in the forecourt there is a taxi rank and a refreshment caravan providing food and drink throughout the day. The Park Gate Tandoori restaurant is located in the former station master's house which forms part of the station building.

References

External links 

Swanwick Station on navigable 1945 O.S. map

Former London and South Western Railway stations
Railway stations in Great Britain opened in 1889
Railway stations in Hampshire
DfT Category E stations
Railway stations served by Govia Thameslink Railway
Railway stations served by South Western Railway
1889 establishments in England